Luis Dávila (July 15, 1927 – August 21, 1998) was an Argentine actor.  He starred in such films as Ivanhoe, the Norman Swordsman.

Dávila was born Héctor González Ferrantino on July 15, 1927 in Buenos Aires, Argentina. He acted in 82 titles from 1952 to 1986.

He died on August 28, 1998 in Buenos Aires.

Selected filmography

 Vigilantes y ladrones (1952)
 El baldío (1952)
 Maria Madalena (1954)
 Sinfonía de juventud (1955)
 Lo que le pasó a Reynoso (1955)
 Canario rojo (1955)
 Requiebro (1955)
 Vida nocturna (1955)
 Mi marido y mi novio (1955)
 Novia para dos (1956)
 Operación Antartida (1957)
 La hermosa mentira (1958)
 Amor se dice cantando (1959)
 Campo arado (1959)
 Vacanze in Argentina (1960)
 Héroes de hoy (1960)
 Carnival of Crime (1962) - Ray Donato
 Bahía de Palma (1962)
 Los que verán a Dios (1963)
 The Twin Girls (1963) - Doctor
 The Blackmailers (1963) - Don Andrés, el sacerdote
 El sol en el espejo (1963) - Carlos
 La gran coartada (1963) - Jorge
 El escándalo (1964)
 Como dos gotas de agua (1964) - Ricardo Arriaga
 Donde tú estés (1964) - Rodolfo
 Una madeja de lana azul celeste (1964)
 Prohibido soñar (1964)
 Relevo para un pistolero (1964) - Edwin Jackson
 Flor salvaje (1965) - Eduardo
 Faites vos jeux, mesdames (1965) - Boris Gourdine
 Espionage in Tangier (1965) - Marc Mato (Mike Murphy) Agent S 077
 Man from Canyon City (1965) - Red El Rayo
 Doc, Hands of Steel (1965) - Slade Carroll
 María Rosa (1965) - Salvador
 Tumba para un forajido (1965) - Frank
 La otra orilla (1965)
 Zampo y yo (1966) - Carlos
 Dynamite Jim (1966) - Dynamite Jim Farrell
 Ypotron - Final Countdown (1966) - Lemmy Logan
 The Viscount (1967) - Steve Heller
 Mission Stardust (1967) - Capt. Mike Bull
 L'uomo del colpo perfetto (1967) - Gustav
 Llaman de Jamaica, Mr. Ward (1968) - Mulligan
 Rebus (1968) - Il Baro
 Suicide Commandos (1968) - Sam
 Death on High Mountain (1969) - Francis Parker / Mark Harrison
 Las amigas (1969) - Pablo
 Simón Bolívar (1969) - Carlos Peñaranda
 Eagles Over London (1969) - Jacques
 Las nenas del mini-mini (1969) - Doctor
 Johnny Ratón (1969) - Hermano Pablo
 A Quiet Place to Kill (1970) - Albert Duchamps
 Verano 70 (1970) - Mario
 Matalo! (1970) - Phil
 The Tigers of Mompracem (1970) - Lord Brooke
 Long Live Robin Hood (1971) - Sir Robert
 Ivanhoe, the Norman Swordsman (1971) - Stephen Cunningham
 Si estás muerto, ¿por qué bailas? (1971) - Robert
 The House of the Doves (1972) - Enrique
 Coartada en disco rojo (1972) - Dr. Michele Azzini
 Las colocadas (1972) - Luis
 Los novios de mi mujer (1972) - Luis Otero
 Basuras humanas (1972) - Antonio
 Pancho Villa (1972) - McDermott
 Las tres perfectas casadas (1973) - Javier Guzmán
 La redada (1973) - Redactor jefe
 La venganza de la momia (1975) - Inspector Taylor
 Hormiga negra (1979)
 Cuatro pícaros bomberos (1979)
 Juventud sin barreras (1979)

References

External links

20th-century Argentine male actors
1927 births
1998 deaths
Male actors from Buenos Aires
Burials at La Chacarita Cemetery